Lionel Joseph Decuir (December 21, 1914 – April 14, 1977) was an American Negro league catcher from 1936 to 1940.

A native of New Orleans, Louisiana, Decuir made his Negro leagues debut in 1936 with the Cincinnati Tigers. He played for Cincinnati and the Pittsburgh Crawfords in 1937, and finished his career with the Kansas City Monarchs in 1939 and 1940. Decuir died in New Orleans in 1977 at age 62.

References

External links
 and Seamheads

1914 births
1977 deaths
Cincinnati Tigers (baseball) players
Kansas City Monarchs players
Pittsburgh Crawfords players
Baseball catchers
Baseball players from New Orleans
20th-century African-American sportspeople